The list of World War I flying aces from Lithuania, at the time a part of the Russian Empire, contains two names, both flew with the Imperial Russian Air Force:

 Ensign Grigoriy Suk was credited with nine confirmed aerial victories while serving with the Imperial Russian Air Force.
 Praporshik Ernst Leman was credited with five confirmed aerial victories while in the IRAF.

References

Lith
World War I aces
Military history of Lithuania
Lithuanian people of World War I